Monica Lakhanpaul FRCPCH is a British Indian consultant paediatrician at Whittington Health NHS Trust, and professor of integrated community child health at University College London (UCL). She is deputy theme lead for Collaborations in Leadership in Applied Health Research and Care – North Thames, adjunct professor at Public Health Foundation India, and also pro vice provost UCL (South Asia).

Early life and education 
Lakhanpaul grew up in Leeds. She graduated with a Bachelor of Medicine (distinction; paediatrics) from the University of Manchester in 1992, and with a Doctor of Medicine from the University of Nottingham in May 2003. Lakhanpaul also gained her doctorate in paediatrics and child health in 2003.

Clinical and research career 

Following on from receiving her doctorate, Lakhanpaul took up simultaneous senior lecturer and consultant paediatrician appointments at the University of Leicester and University Hospitals of Leicester NHS Trust, respectively. In 2012, Lakhanpaul took up her professorship at the UCL GOS Institute of Child Heath, and in 2016 she was appointed head of the Department of Population, Policy and Practice. She continues to practice clinically as a paediatrician in London, and through her Pro-Vice-Provost (South Asia) and Global Strategic Academic Advisor (India) roles, leads on strategy and delivery of partnerships and collaboration between UCL and South Asia and India.

Lakhanpaul's research is multi-disciplinary and translational with particular focus on research programs with a cross-sector, multi-disciplinary, structured and collaborative approach. Her work spans from clinical trials to participatory methods including public engagement and working with the arts and humanities to improve outcomes for vulnerable children, with a focus on the UK and India. She particularly focuses on disability, asthma and nutrition as exemplar public health issues in South Asian families to optimise their health and later risk for non-communicable disease.

Lakhanpaul has been instrumental in establishing the PANChSHEEL study around integrated health, education and environmental intervention to optimise infant feeding practices through school and Anganwadi networks in India and has been widely reported on both in the UK and India. This is a collaboration between University College London, Save the Children, Jawaharlal Nehru University, Delhi, and the Indian Institute of Technology, Delhi.

Lakhanpaul established the Nurture Early for Optimal Nutrition (NEON) study to determine whether transferring health models from resource poor countries and implementing them in deprived localities in the UK could lead to clinically and cost-effective interventions within the NHS. Working with parents and healthcare professionals, Lakhanpaul also established Acutely Sick Child Safety Netting Information Needs (ASK SNIFF) which provides resources to help families with young children understand signs and symptoms of acute illness. It forms part of a larger program of work aiming to develop an intervention package to improve the management of acutely sick children.

Lakhanpaul co-founded the cross-sector Health Education Engineering and Environment (HEEE) Platform, and was Program Director for Children and Young People, UCL Partners Academic Health Sciences Network.

Awards and recognition 

 Asian Women of Achievement Award (2010)
HSJ Patient Safety Award for ‘Spotting the Sick Child’ (Patient Safety in Diagnosis) (2011)
NICE Fellow (2010-2013)
 Founding clinical director for the National Collaborating Centre of Women and Children's Health

References 

Year of birth missing (living people)
Living people
British paediatricians
English women medical doctors
People from Leeds
Fellows of the Royal College of Paediatrics and Child Health
Academics of University College London
21st-century British medical doctors
Alumni of the University of Manchester
Alumni of the University of Nottingham
Women pediatricians
Medical doctors from Yorkshire
British people of Indian descent
21st-century English women
21st-century English people